Animax Portugal was the Portuguese version of Animax. The channel launched in April 2008 and was closed in May 2011. Originally, the channel broadcast anime only, but started airing live-action shows in 2009.

History
Animax Portugal launched in Portugal as a programming block on AXN on 20 October 2007. The block ended in September 2008. The channel fully launched on 12 April 2008 in Portugal on Clix and Meo. The channel later extended its reach to ZON in April 2009.

Animax was closed on 9 May 2011 due to low ratings, when AXN Black launched in its place.

List of programs

 Peach Girl
 Nana
 Initial D
 Orphen
 Orphen: Revenge
 Moribito: Guardian of the Spirit
 Gungrave
 Samurai Champloo
 Gunslinger Girl
 Super GALS!
 Death Note
 Blood+
 Trigun
 Ultimate Muscle
 Ergo Proxy
 Outlaw Star
 Excel Saga
 Love Hina
 Nodame Cantabile
 Le Chevalier D'Eon
 .hack//Sign
 Yakitate!! Japan
 Corrector Yui
 Saint Seiya
 InuYasha
 Detective Conan
 The Law of Ueki
 Honey and Clover
 Saiyuki
 Black Lagoon
 Kochikame
 Air Gear
 Crayon Shin-chan
 Lupin III
 Tsubasa: Reservoir Chronicle
 Naruto
 Naruto Shippuden
 Hunter × Hunter
 Chobits
 Mazinger Z
 Reaper
 Afterworld
 Supernatural
 Primeval
 10 Things I Hate About You
 Charmed
 The Big Bang Theory
 Chuck
 Cock'd Gunns
 Fandemonium
 Forbidden Science
 The Amazing Race
 Make It or Break It
 Torchwood
 True Blood

See also
 Animax
 AXN (Portugal)

References

External links
 Animax Portugal (archived)
 Facebook page
 Twitter page

Animax
Sony Pictures Television
Defunct television channels in Portugal
Portuguese-language television networks
Television networks in Portugal
Television stations in Portugal
Television channels and stations established in 2008
Television channels and stations disestablished in 2011
2008 establishments in Portugal
2011 disestablishments in Portugal